Bill Bergson and the White Rose Rescue (original Swedish title: Kalle Blomkvist och Rasmus) is a 1997 Swedish film. It is based on the novel with the same name, written by Astrid Lindgren. Another film was produced when the book was published in 1953, see Bill Bergson and the White Rose Rescue (1953 film).

About the film 
There are differences between the book and this film:
 At the kidnapping, it's Nicke who guards the car but in the book it's Svedberg, the 4th kidnapper, who also is removed from the film.
 Anders and Kalle build a hut in the forest on the island, but here they live in a cave.
 The professor is locked-in in a room upstairs of the kidnappers' main house, but in the book he is locked in a small house.
 In the scene, when the children attack Nicke, Rasmus does not throw out Nicke's key through the window, instead he keeps it hidden in the house.
 The floatplane doesn't sink due to the float Kalle cut; instead he screws off the guy-wire of the plane so it is impossible to control it and then it crashes into a tower.
 In the film, the Rövarspråket is never used.

The theme music Vår vitaste ros is written and produced by Peter and Nanne Grönvall and sung by Sanna Nielsen.

Cast 
Malte Forsberg as Kalle Blomkvist
Josefin Årling as Eva-Lotta
Totte Steneby as Anders
William Svedberg as Rasmus
Jan Mybrand as the professor, Rasmus' father
Claes Malmberg as Björk, policeman
Johan Stattin as Jonte, "Röda Rosen"
Bobo Steneby as Benke
Victor Sandberg as Sixten
Rolf Degerlund as Peters
Patrik Bergner as Blom
Pierre Lindstedt as Nicke

References

External links 
 
 

1997 films
Films based on Bill Bergson
Swedish children's films
1990s Swedish-language films
1990s Swedish films